Zbigniew Cyganik (20 November 1932 – 12 November 2022) was a Polish politician. A member of the Polish United Workers' Party, he served as Voivode of Zielona Góra from 1980 to 1982.

Cyganik died in Zielona Góra on 12 November 2022, at the age of 89.

References

1932 births
2022 deaths
Polish United Workers' Party members
Politicians from Kraków